Amy Gardiner (born October 17, 1985) is an American animator and fine artist living in Easthampton, Massachusetts. She is an alumna of Cleveland Institute of Art. She is the creator of the short animation Space Beavers and has contributed to the comics anthology PUPPYTEETH.  

In 2012 she cofounded Art Party Studio, a shared studio and gallery space that provides creative support to local artists.

Amy grew up in the rural area of Nanticoke, NY and attended the Whitney Point Central School District.

Publications
 The Van(2011) a short comic published in the second issue of the comics anthology PUPPYTEETH.
 Starshine(2010) a short comic published in PUPPYTEETH.

Filmography 
 Taste for Peaches:Speedy Slugs (2012)
 Monsters Anonymous (2008)
 Space Beavers (2007)
 Starsmasher (2007)
 Speed Geezers (2006)
 Mortimer:Talking to Yourself (2006)
 Mortimer:The Story of an Old Man's Battle With Himself (2006)

Exhibitions 
 In 2011, at the Nacul Gallery Creating Multiple Realities show Amherst, Massachusetts.
 In 2011, featured at the Bon Appétit Burlesque: Heros and Villains show at the World War II Club in Northampton, Massachusetts.
 In 2008, at the Cleveland Institute of Art BFA exhibit in Cleveland, Ohio.
 In 2008, at the annual EMIT film festival at the Cleveland Cinematheque in Cleveland, Ohio.
 In 2008, at the Coffee House Gallery in the Cleveland Institute of Art in Cleveland, Ohio.
 In 2007, at the Cleveland Cinematheque in Cleveland, Ohio, at the EMIT film festival.
 In 2006, at the Coffee House Gallery in the Cleveland Institute of Art in Cleveland, Ohio.
 In 2006, in the Future Center of the Cleveland Institute of Art, in Cleveland, Ohio.
 In 2006, at the Cleveland Cinematheque for the EMIT film festival in Cleveland, Ohio.

Awards and reviews 
In 2008 she received an honorable mention for her animated short Space Beavers. Shown at the EMIT film festival, it also received positive attention in the Cleveland Free TIMES.

References

1985 births
Living people
American animators
American women animators
People from Easthampton, Massachusetts
Cleveland Institute of Art alumni
Artists from Massachusetts